Kolani may refer to:
 Luigi Colani
 Kolanı (disambiguation), places in Azerbaijan
 Kolani, Iran (disambiguation), places in Iran